Nigerian-British Chamber of Commerce (NBCC) is created to foster bilateral trade relations between Nigeria and The United Kingdom. This organisation has become an international affiliate of the British Chamber of Commerce (BCC) The Chamber has members from different sectors of the Nigerian economy.

Activities 
The NBCC's engagements include: incoming and outgoing trade missions between the two countries, organising training, workshops, conferences and seminars which are conducted by top authorities from different fields.

The NBCC creates a good platform for its members and non-members, by adding value to its members and also improving membership benefits by encouraging business relationships, and improved association by encouraging discussion on topical issues confronting the economy; particularly Nigerian-British trade amongst members

The NBCC allows its members to access a network of 53 Chambers of Commerce across the United Kingdom and 49 other international affiliates around the world.

The NBCC has been involved in fostering bilateral trade and discussions between the Nigerian and United Kingdom businesses.

The organisation is also involved in disseminating information on government policies to its stakeholders, and foster networking amongst NBCC members and improving the membership experience.

References

Chambers of commerce in Nigeria
Foreign trade of Nigeria
Nigeria–United Kingdom relations